The Murderbot Diaries is a science fiction series by American author Martha Wells and published by Tor.com. The series is about a part robot, part human construct designed as a Security Unit (SecUnit). The SecUnit manages to override its governor module, thus enabling it to develop independence, which it primarily uses to watch soap operas. As it spends more time with a series of caring people (both humans and fellow artificial intelligences), it starts developing friendships and emotional connections, which it finds inconvenient.

Works
The first book of the series, All Systems Red, was published in May 2017. A sequel, Artificial Condition, was released on May 8, 2018, followed by Rogue Protocol on August 7, 2018. The next installment, Exit Strategy, was released on October 2, 2018. Wells noted in 2017 that the four novellas "do have an overarching story, with the fourth one bringing the arc to a conclusion." A full Murderbot novel, Network Effect, was released on May 5, 2020. Fugitive Telemetry, taking place chronologically between Exit Strategy and Network Effect, was published in April 2021.

Three more books are planned. In December 2022, Wells announced the upcoming full-length novel, System Collapse which is scheduled to be published in November 2023.

A Murderbot short story, "The Future of Work: Compulsory", which takes place before All Systems Red, was published in Wired in 2018. It describes Murderbot's life after it hacked its governor module.

A second short story, "Home: Habitat, Range, Niche, Territory", taking place between Exit Strategy and Fugitive Telemetry, was published on Tor.com in 2021.

A third short story "Obsolescence" takes place during the early colonization of Earth's solar system aboard an education space station in orbit near Jupiter. Published in "Take us to a Better Place: Stories" a collection of short stories on health published by The Robert Wood Johnson Foundation in 2019.

All Systems Red

A scientific expedition on an alien planet goes awry when one of its members is attacked by a giant native creature. She is saved by the expedition's SecUnit (Security Unit), a cyborg security agent. The SecUnit has secretly hacked the governor module that allows it to be controlled by humans and named itself "Murderbot", as it is heavily armed and designed for combat, but prefers to spend its time watching soap operas and is uncomfortable interacting with humans. The SecUnit has a vested interest in keeping its human clients safe and alive, since it wants to avoid discovery of its autonomy and has an especially grisly past expedition on its record. Murderbot soon discovers that information regarding hazardous fauna has been deleted from their survey packet of the planet. Further investigation reveals that some sections of their maps are missing as well. Meanwhile, the PreservationAux survey team, led by Dr. Mensah, navigate their mixed feelings about the part machine, part human nature of their SecUnit. As members of an egalitarian, independent planet outside of the Corporation Rim, the survey team struggles with the system of indentured servitude that the rim operates under, believing it to be slavery. When they lose contact with the other known expedition, the DeltFall Group, Mensah leads a team to the opposite side of the planet to investigate. At the DeltFall habitat, Murderbot discovers that everyone there has been brutally murdered, and one of their three SecUnits destroyed. Murderbot disables the remaining two as they attack it, but is surprised when two others appear; it destroys one, and Mensah takes the other.

Murderbot is seriously injured, and realizes that one of the rogue SecUnits has installed a combat override module into its neck. The Preservation scientists are able to remove it before it completes the data upload that would put Murderbot under the control of whoever has command over the other SecUnits. The team discovers that Murderbot is autonomous, and once malfunctioned and murdered fifty-seven people. The Preservation scientists mostly agree that, based on its protective behavior thus far, the SecUnit can be trusted. Remembering small incidents that now appear to be attempted sabotage, Murderbot and the group determine that there must be a third expedition on the planet, whose members are trying to eliminate DeltFall and Preservation for some reason. The Preservation scientists confirm that their HubSystem has been hacked, and flee their habitat before the mystery expedition they have dubbed "EvilSurvey" comes to kill them. The EvilSurvey team—GrayCris—leaves a message in the Preservation habitat inviting its scientists to meet at a rendezvous point to negotiate terms for their survival. Murderbot knows that GrayCris will never let them live, but the SecUnit has a plan. It makes an overture to GrayCris to negotiate for its own freedom, but this is a distraction while the Preservation scientists access the GrayCris HubSystem to activate their emergency beacon. The plan works, but Murderbot is injured protecting Mensah from the explosion of the launch. Later the SecUnit finds itself repaired, and retaining its memories and disabled governor module. Mensah has bought its contract, and plans to bring it back to Preservation's home base where it can legally live autonomously. Though grateful, Murderbot is reluctant to have its decisions made for it, and slips away on a cargo ship.

Artificial Condition
Murderbot hacks its way onto unmanned cargo ships to travel toward the mining facility where it once malfunctioned. It hopes to learn more about the initial incident in which it went rogue, of which it has little memory. Murderbot reluctantly befriends the powerful, intrusive bot that pilots the research transport in which it is making the final leg of its journey to RaviHyral, the station where the incident occurred. Murderbot allows this artificial intelligence—which it has dubbed ART (Asshole Research Transport) due to its sarcastic personality—to make physical modifications to the SecUnit's body that will better allow it to pass for an augmented human, and to disconnect the data port at the back of its neck which had been used to insert a combat override module in the previous book. 

To gain access to the RaviHyral facility, Murderbot takes a contract as a security consultant for three scientists who are meeting with their former employer, the head and namesake of Tlacey Excavations, to negotiate the return of their research, which they believe was illegally seized by the company. Their transport craft is sabotaged, but with ART's help, Murderbot is able to land it safely. Now aware that Tlacey is actively trying to kill the scientists rather than comply with their demands, Murderbot guides them through their meeting with Tlacey, and thwarts another assassination attempt. Murderbot returns to the site of the massacre and learns that it was the result of another mining operation's sabotage attempt using malware, which made all of the facility's SecUnits go rogue. The facility's ComfortUnits—weaponless, anatomically correct forms of cyborg primarily used as "sexbots", died attempting to stop the massacre.

Tlacey's ComfortUnit voices its desire for freedom and willingness to help Murderbot thwart Tlacey. While the SecUnit meets with a Tlacey employee to secretly retrieve a copy of the research, Tlacey abducts one of the scientists, Tapan. Murderbot goes after her, accepting a combat override module that is intended to control the SecUnit but actually has no effect, due to ART's previous modifications to its data port. Once inside the shuttle, Murderbot neutralizes Tlacey's guards and retrieves a wounded Tapan, and Tlacey is killed. Tapan is healed by the MedSystem on ART's ship, and Murderbot hacks the governor module of the ComfortUnit to grant it its freedom. Murderbot sets off on its own.

Rogue Protocol
Murderbot makes its way to a recently abandoned GrayCris terraforming facility in orbit over the planet Milu to collect further evidence of the company's past crimes. Befriending a pet-like humanoid bot named Miki as a means to keep its presence hidden, the SecUnit secretly follows a team of humans sent to assess the facility before a new company takes possession of it. Murderbot is forced to reveal itself when the humans are attacked by a hostile combat robot, and one of the researchers is captured. Hiding its lack of a governor module and pretending to have been sent by "Security Consultant Rin", Murderbot attempts to guide the humans—most of whom have never worked with a SecUnit before—while still seeming to defer to them. The exceptions are the team's hired security detail, Wilken and Gerth, who know Murderbot's capabilities as a SecUnit and are wary of it. They divide the team, Gerth taking two of the researchers back to their fellows on the shuttle, and Wilken leading Murderbot, Miki, and Miki's guardian Don Abene to rescue the hostage, Hirune. Aware of the failings of human security professionals, Murderbot conceives its own plan to rescue Hirune, which succeeds.

The injured Murderbot comes upon Wilken attempting to kill Abene, but manages to hack into Wilken's combat armor and seize control of it. Theorizing that Wilken and Gerth had been secretly hired by GrayCris to destroy the facility before anyone could discover the illegal mining activities going on there, Murderbot leads Miki and the researchers back to the shuttle. Meanwhile, Wilken and Gerth have set in motion the destruction of the tractor array that is keeping the facility from breaking up in the atmosphere. Murderbot neutralizes Gerth's combat armor and halts the destruction of the array, and the shuttle takes off as more hostile combat robots arrive. One forces its way in; Murderbot destroys it, but not before it destroys Miki. Murderbot decides to deliver the evidence to Dr. Mensah personally.

Exit Strategy
Murderbot is suspicious when the robot ship it has taken to HaveRatton Station is diverted to a dock near station security. Murderbot sneaks off the craft through a rear airlock, and soon confirms that an armed boarding team is waiting to storm the ship in search of a rogue SecUnit. Learning that Dr. Mensah has been accused of corporate espionage by GrayCris and is now missing, Murderbot determines that she has likely been abducted by the company and taken to the corporate hub at TranRollinHyfa. Murderbot realizes that its actions on Milu have put Mensah in danger, and notes the possibility that GrayCris is luring it to TranRollinHyfa, but goes anyway. Murderbot approaches the three members of Mensah's original expedition team—Ratthi, Pin-Lee, Gurathin—who are there trying to amass the funds to pay the ransom GrayCris has demanded for Mensah. They hatch a plan wherein they will pretend to have the money and arrange for an exchange, as a means to draw Mensah out of the impenetrable security zone.

The ruse works, and the three researchers flee to their contracted gunship while Murderbot moves to retrieve Mensah. Murderbot dispatches Mensah's captors easily, but a station-wide alarm is triggered before they can reach a shuttle. Three hostile SecUnits arrive. Murderbot convinces Mensah to escape, intending to sacrifice itself for her, and seizes control of all nearby drones and hauler bots to create chaos. Mensah and her team manage to manually open a gate for the critically injured Murderbot to escape. Fleeing on the gunship, they are pursued by a Palisade security ship that attacks the gunship with a computer virus intended to seize control of its systems, neutralize any augmented human crew, and open all the airlocks. Murderbot and the bot pilot hold off the worst effects of the malware, and manage to isolate the virus in a shuttle that they disengage from the gunship. With control of the gunship restored, the captain fires on the Palisade ship and the team makes their escape. Murderbot has a critical system failure, and collapses.

After awakening in a med bay with Mensah and the team as they arrive at their home base, Preservation, Murderbot begins a lengthy self-repair process. Mensah and her team offer to shelter Murderbot until it is back up to 100% functionality and can decide what it wants to do next, even if it is just to watch media. The team invites Murderbot along on their upcoming expedition as their security detail, and Mensah later mentions that GoodNightLander—the contractor of Murderbot's Milu clients—also wants to hire "Security Consultant Rin". Murderbot is content to know that it has options.

"The Future of Work: Compulsory"
SecUnit deals with callous humans in an engagement previous to meeting the Preservation team.

"Obsolescence"
On an education space station near Jupiter, an augmented human named Greggy is found dead. Station manager Jixy investigates and finds Greggy has been brutally murdered and several augments from his body have been stolen by the killer. This story provides clues about the origins of SecUnits and the Corporate Rim society.

Network Effect
Murderbot has been sent by Dr. Mensah on a research expedition that includes her daughter Amena, her brother-in-law Thiago, and Drs. Arada, Overse, and Ratthi. Their ship is set upon by a hostile transport vessel, which Murderbot and Amena are compelled to board as the others flee in an escape pod. As the transport moves into a nearby wormhole, Murderbot hunts the grey-skinned humanoids in control of the ship, isolates Amena and the human captives Ras and Eletra in a safe zone, and begins to realize that the transport is the same one once controlled by its robot pilot friend ART.

Arada and the others, who have followed the ship into the wormhole, are able to board as Murderbot finishes off the hostiles and manages to reload a deleted ART with a code phrase left for it. As Murderbot guessed, after being invaded by the grey raiders, ART sent them after the SecUnit ostensibly for use as a weapon, but really because ART determined that Murderbot could overcome them. Murderbot is enraged that ART would endanger the SecUnit's humans this way, and is further annoyed when ART insists that Murderbot and its human crew help find and recover the transport vessel's missing crew.

Murderbot and its team descend to the planetary colony that seems to be at the center of the situation, and find that the colonists have been exposed to alien remnant contamination. They have developed the grey skin condition to varying degrees, and have separated into warring factions representing the least contaminated versus the most, who seem controlled by an alien hive mind. The missing crew have effected their own escape, and while Arada and her people help them, Murderbot is captured. ART begins firing missiles at the colony, demanding its release. Murderbot is rescued with the help of another SecUnit whose governor module it disabled, as well as a software version of itself set loose on the colony's defenses. The group returns to Preservation, and Murderbot decides to accompany ART and its crew on their next mission.

"Home: Habitat, Range, Niche, Territory"
Dr. Mensah examines the trauma inflicted on her by the kidnapping by GrayCris and the effect it has had on the SecUnit.

Fugitive Telemetry
Note: Although this book was the sixth published in the series, it is a prequel to book 5, Network Effect. 

Much to the chagrin of the station's security team, Murderbot is asked by Dr. Mensah to investigate the murder of an unidentified traveler on the Preservation Station. An uneasy truce exists between Murderbot and Senior Station Security Officer Indah, and it has agreed to remain incognito and not hack private station systems while on board.

Without access to security systems, Murderbot delves into good old-fashioned detective work, getting a bot at the traveler's hostel to help it locate the victim's rooms, then using the data to locate a transport in distress docked to the transit hub. After breaking into the transport (aided and abetted by Ratthi and Gurathin) and discovering the scene of the crime, Murderbot is told to continue investigating with Special Investigator Aylan. Aylan and an official from Port Authority locate a suspicious transport caught in the post-crime lockdown, and are trapped inside by hostiles. Luckily, a Port Authority bot named Balin jams the door open and Murderbot rescues them, taking the five transport hostiles into custody. Under questioning, the hostiles reveal that they are part of a refugee route, funneling slaves off a non-corporate-ring mining planet called BreharWallHan. The most recent batch of refugees were supposed to meet with the murdered traveler to continue their escape, and they are likely still on the station. 

Based on its help in the investigation, Senior Indah allows Murderbot to access the Station Security System. It determines that the refugees entered a storage module that only had enough oxygen for 24 hours. It also tries to find a leak in the security system, as surveillance footage has clearly been altered by someone internal, to no avail. Before it can investigate further, the module is located attached to another ship trapped in the lockdown. Murderbot takes an inflatable space "rescue dinghy" from the oldest part of the space station to retrieve the refugees. They are wary, but send a small group of children and parents back to the station. It becomes apparent that the bounty hunters who collected them are going to jettison the module into space and kill the remaining refugees, so Murderbot forces its way into their ship, disarms the bounty hunters, and allows station security to collect the remaining refugees safely. It is concerned that the bounty hunters have another SecUnit, which turns out to be a human in configured SecUnit armor. 

Once it returns to Preservation, and is almost crushed by a Port Authority crane, Murderbot figures out who has been seamlessly hacking the Security System. Murderbot returns to the Port Authority offices, evacuates the humans, and goes after the murderer: Balin the Port Authority Bot, whose exterior conceals a CombatBot controlled by the owners of BreharWallHan. This CombatBot fights with Murderbot until they fall into the central transit ring of the station, where Murderbot finds a small army of non-conflict bots from Preservation Station there as backup (including the bot from the hostel and a Port Authority bot who helped search for refugees). Knowing that it cannot defeat a SecUnit and a horde of non-lethal-but-unified bots, the CombatBot-that-was-Balin powers down. The mystery solved, Senior Indah offers to pay Murderbot for its services, and offers it future consulting work. It agrees, finding that it doesn't dread the task, but only "if it's really weird."

Reception
Publishers Weekly wrote that Wells "gives depth to a rousing but basically familiar action plot by turning it into the vehicle by which SecUnit engages with its own rigorously denied humanity". The Verge likewise felt All Systems Red to be a "pretty basic story", but nonetheless "fun", and lauded Wells's worldbuilding. James Nicoll observed that the plot relies on "opportunistic corporate malevolence", and noted that only Murderbot's personality prevented the setting from being "unrelentingly grim".

All Systems Red won the 2018 Nebula Award for Best Novella, the 2018 Hugo Award for Best Novella, and the American Library Association's Alex Award, and was nominated for the 2017 Philip K. Dick Award. The three following novellas had enough votes for the 2019 Hugo Award final ballot but Wells declined all nominations except for Artificial Condition, which won. Network Effect won the 2021 Nebula Award for Best Novel, the 2021 Hugo Award for Best Novel, and the 2021 Locus Award for Best Science Fiction Novel. The Murderbot Diaries won the 2021 Hugo Award for Best Series.

Adaptations
In 2021, Wells said that a potential TV series adaptation was in development, and that she had read the script and was "really excited about it”.

References

External links
 

2017 American novels
2017 science fiction novels
American science fiction novels
Novels set on fictional planets
Tor Books books
Cyborgs in literature
Nebula Award for Best Novella-winning works
Hugo Award for Best Novella winning works
Hugo Award-winning works